Željko Ivanek (born August 15, 1957) is a Slovenian American actor known for his role as Ray Fiske on Damages, for which he won a Primetime Emmy Award. Ivanek is also known for his role of Ed Danvers on Homicide: Life on the Street and Homicide: The Movie, J.J. Percy Walker on Big Love, Governor James Devlin on Oz, Andre Drazen on 24, Blake Sterling on the short-lived series The Event, Emile "The Hunter" Danko in Heroes, and Leland Goines in 12 Monkeys. From 2014 until 2019, he starred as Russell Jackson in the drama Madam Secretary. He also had a recurring role as FBI Special Agent Jim Racine in the series Banshee. 

For his active stage career, he has been awarded a Drama Desk Award and has been nominated for three Tony Awards.

Early life and education
Ivanek was born in Ljubljana, PR Slovenia, FPR Yugoslavia, to the family of Ferdo Ivanek, originally from Varaždin, Croatia, and Vojka nee Šimić. In 1960, Željko, his mother and younger brother, Ivan, immigrated to Palo Alto, California, where his father was working as a research assistant at the Department of Electrical Engineering at Stanford University. His mother also worked at Stanford University as a project manager.

After a two-year stay, in 1962, the family moved back to Slovenia for five years and then returned to Palo Alto in 1967. Having performed in numerous community theater plays in the San Francisco Bay Area, he graduated from Ellwood P. Cubberley High School in Palo Alto in 1975. Ivanek graduated from Yale University majoring in theater in 1978 and attended the London Academy of Music and Dramatic Art afterward.

Acting career

Ivanek has worked extensively on the stage. In 1982, he originated the role of Hally in Athol Fugard's play "Master Harold"...and the Boys. He appeared in the U.S. premieres of Cloud Nine (for which he earned the 1981 Drama Desk Award for Outstanding Featured Actor in a Play) and The Pillowman. He performs frequently on Broadway and has been nominated for three Tony Awards, for his performances in the original production of Brighton Beach Memoirs, in Two Shakespearean Actors, and in a revival of The Caine Mutiny Court-Martial, alongside David Schwimmer and Tim Daly.

However, Ivanek is perhaps best known for his supporting roles in a number of well-known television series. His first television role was as Sammie Wheaton on the soap opera The Edge of Night. Other roles include Emile Danko in Heroes; Roland in The X-Files; prosecuting attorney Ed Danvers in Homicide: Life on the Street; Ray Fiske in Damages; J.J. in Big Love; the Magister in True Blood; Governor James Devlin in Oz; Serbian terrorist Andre Drazen in 24; and Blake Sterling, the Director of National Intelligence in the NBC drama series The Event. 

Most recently, Ivanek played Russell Jackson in the TV series Madam Secretary. He portrayed John Dickinson, the Pennsylvania representative to the Second Continental Congress, in the miniseries John Adams. He has guest-starred on such shows as Law & Order: Special Victims Unit and House. He has appeared several times on Law & Order, both as one-off characters and as Ed Danvers, this last in crossover episodes with Homicide: Life on the Street.

In addition to his stage and television work, Ivanek has appeared in more than 20 feature films, including The Sender, in which he made his feature film debut as the unnamed title character, School Ties, Black Hawk Down, In Bruges, Dogville, The Bourne Legacy, Donnie Brasco, Argo, Seven Psychopaths and Three Billboards Outside Ebbing, Missouri.

In 2012, he portrayed Dr. Stafford White in the drama The Mob Doctor. As of 2014, he has supporting roles in several shows on broadcast and cable television, including the series Revolution, where he plays the recurring roles of Dr. Calvin Horn and an illusory nanotech avatar of Horn; Suits; Banshee; and The Americans.

In the documentary That Guy... Who Was in That Thing, Ivanek states that his contract includes a rider to ensure that the first letter in his name, Ž, has its caron properly rendered in any credits sequence where his name appears.

Awards
Ivanek has received recognition for his on-screen work. In 2008, he was awarded the Primetime Emmy Award for Outstanding Supporting Actor in a Drama Series for his performance in the role of Ray Fiske on Damages.

Filmography

Film

Television

Stage

References

External links

 
 
Željko Ivanek at Internet Off-Broadway Database
 Zeljko Ivanek(Aveleyman)

1957 births
Living people
Actors from Ljubljana
Yugoslav emigrants to the United States
American expatriates in England
American male television actors
American male stage actors
American male film actors
American people of Slovenian descent
Yale University alumni
Outstanding Performance by a Supporting Actor in a Drama Series Primetime Emmy Award winners
Outstanding Performance by a Cast in a Motion Picture Screen Actors Guild Award winners
Male actors from Palo Alto, California
Alumni of the London Academy of Music and Dramatic Art
20th-century American male actors
21st-century American male actors
American people of Croatian descent 
Slovenian people of Croatian descent